Luis Leal may refer to:
Luis Leal (baseball) (born 1957), Venezuelan baseball player
Luis Leal (writer) (1907–2010), Mexican-American writer and critic
Luis Leal (footballer, born 1929), Chilean footballer
Luís Leal (footballer, born 1987), Santomean football player
Luis Miguel Leal, Venezuelan music video director